The 2018 Asia-Oceania Korfball Championship is being held in Saitama, Japan with 10 national teams in competition, from July 29 to August 5. It is the tenth edition of the Asia-Oceania Korfball Championship and serves as a qualifier for the 2019 IKF World Korfball Championship, with the top 6 teams qualifying (with a minimum of 1 for Oceania). Chinese Taipei are the defending champions and have all previous editions, except the edition of 2004 which was won by Australia.

Group stage
The ten participating teams were drawn into two groups of five, with teams in each group playing one another in a round-robin basis. The top two teams in each group qualify for the semi-finals, while the teams finishing third and fourth playoff for places 5 to 8. The two teams finishing last will play for 9th place.

Group A

|}

Group B

|}

Knockout stage

Semi-finals

5th–8th place play-offs

9th–10th place play-offs

Final standings 
The top 6 qualified for the 2019 IKF World Korfball Championship.

References

External links
IKF Asian Oceanian Korfball Championship - 2018

Asia-Oceania Korfball Championship
Korfball in Japan
2018 in korfball